Rhaeteae or Rhaiteai was a town in ancient Arcadia, in the district of Cynuria. It was located at the confluence of the Gortynius and Alpheius. Its site is unlocated.

References

Populated places in ancient Arcadia
Former populated places in Greece
Lost ancient cities and towns